Sonnet 150 is one of 154 sonnets written by the English playwright and poet William Shakespeare. It is considered a Dark Lady sonnet, as are all from 127 to 152.  Nonetheless  150 is an outlier, and in some ways appears to belong more to the Fair Youth.

Structure 
Sonnet 150 is an English or Shakespearean sonnet. The English sonnet has three quatrains, followed by a final rhyming couplet. It follows the typical rhyme scheme of the form ABAB CDCD EFEF GG and is composed in iambic pentameter, a type of poetic metre based on five pairs of metrically weak/strong syllabic positions. The 12th line exemplifies a regular iambic pentameter:

 ×   /  ×     /    ×       /  ×  /   ×   / 
With others thou shouldst not abhor my state: (150.12)
/ = ictus, a metrically strong syllabic position. × = nonictus.

The 5th line (potentially) begins with a common metrical variant, an initial reversal; and it ends with the rightward movement of the fourth ictus (resulting in a four-position figure, × × / /, sometimes referred to as a minor ionic):

  /     ×     ×    /   × / ×   ×    /    / 
Whence hast thou this becoming of things ill, (150.5)

Lines 1, 8, and 11 also potentially have initial reversals, and line 3 has a minor ionic.

The meter demands that line 1's "power" function as one syllable, and "powerful" as two.

Notes

References

British poems
Sonnets by William Shakespeare